Francis Chapelet (born 3 March 1934 in Paris) the son of painter Roger Chapelet, is a French classical organist.

Career 
Francis Chapelet started studying the organ at the école César Franck, under the direction of Édouard Souberbielle. He later studied at the Conservatoire de Paris where he won the first prizes in harmony (with Maurice Duruflé as professor), and organ and improvisation (with Rolande Falcinelli) in 1961.

In 1964, he was named co-holder of the organ of the Saint-Séverin in Paris, a position he held for twenty years, and of which he remains an honorary member. He was a member of the two organ commissions (classified, unclassified) of the Ministry of Culture. He is also honorary organist of San Giovanni dei Fiorentini in Rome.

He created the organ class of the Conservatoire de Bordeaux of which he was in charge until 1996.

Francis Chapelet is known to be one of the specialists of Spanish organ and has directed the International Academy of Iberian Organ of Castile. He is also a corresponding member of the Real Academia de Bellas Artes de San Fernando in Madrid.

Honours: Chevalier of the Ordre National du Mérite, Officier of the Ordre des Arts et des Lettres.

Discography 
 Series "Orgues Historiques": Covarrubias, ref HMO n°7 Improvisations and Correa de Arauxo, Cabanilles...
 Series "Orgues Historiques": Salamanque, ref n°10 Improvisations
 Series "Orgues Historiques": Frederiksborg - Sweelink and improvisations, ref HM n°16
 Series "Orgues Historiques": Tolède - Improvisations, ref HM 4519.1.24
 Series "Orgues Historiques": Ciudad Rodrigo - Cabezon, Anonymes, Correa de Arauxo, Narvaez, T.L.de Santa Maria..., ref HM n°14
 Series "Orgues Historiques": Trujillo - Improvisations, ref HM 4511 n° 18
 Series "Orgues Historiques": Lisbonne - Improvisations, ref HM 4517 n° 1.22
 Series "Orgues Historiques": Roquemaure - Suite de danses, Attaingnant, Buxtehude, L. Couperin, Swellinck, ref HM4520 
 Orgue Renaissance de Roquemaure - Swellink, Scheidt, Buxtehude, L. Couperin, M. Lanes, ref HM 932
 Aux orgues d'Espagne de Trujillo, Salamanque, Covarrubias and Ciudad Rodrigo - Antonio de Cabezon, ref HM Opus 15
 Organs of Lisbonne - Araujo, Cabanilles, Correa de Arauxo ... ref: HM 704
 Orgues des Baléares - Swellinck, Scheidt, Boehm, Fischer, Pachelbel, Scheidemann, ref HM 948
 Series "Grands Organistes"  Revival of the Lisbon pieces, Salamanque, Trujillo, Covarrubias and Fredericksborg, ref HM 34757
 Coffret: Orgues d'Espagne - Aux orgues de Salamanque, Trujillo, Tolède, Covarrubias, Palma de Majorque, ref HM765
 Series "Orgues Historiques" n°9 - Organ of Carpentras (P. Quoirin 1974) Cabanilles, P.Bruna, Scheidt, J.S.Bach.
 CD - Orgues Historiques d'Europe - Baléares, Trujillo, Covarrubias - 2CDs ref: HMA 1901226 and HMA 1901225.
 L'orgue contemporain à Notre Dame de Paris - ETNA 71 (in collaboration with Haroun Tazieff) ref: FY Solstice SOCD 192
 El Organo Castellano - Abarca de Campos et Frechilla - Anonymous, Soto de Langa, Cabezon, M.Lopez, Cabanilles... ref: Valois V4653
 Les chemins de l'orgue en Aquitaine - Organs of Montpon-Ménestérol and Vanxains, Échourgnac, Chantérac. 
 Church of the Holy Cross, Bordeaux - Organ Dom Bedos - F. Couperin, Grigny, Guilain, Dandrieu and improvisation
 Organ of Grignan - live, Dandrieu, Correa de Arauxo, Swellinck, J.S.Bach and improvisations.
 Music for two organs in Cusco Cathedral - (with Uriel Valadeau) L. Couperin, Soto de Langa, Cabezon, Pasquini ...

Bibliography 
 Chapelet, Francis, L'Œuvre pour orgue (volume 1: Pièces et improvisations dans l'esthétique classique, volume 2: Pièces et improvisations dans le style modal et contemporain), éditions Delatour, 2013.
 Chapelet, Francis, Livre d'improvisation et d'accompagnement, éditions Les presses de la Double, 2002, 68 pages.
 Chapelet, Francis, Les Orgues de Montpon-Ménestérol, Les Presses de la Double. 
 Chapelet, Francis, Chroniques en Chamade, SIC Éditions in Brussel.
 Chapelet, Francis, L'orgue Espagnol, Les Presses de la Double (a collection of Iberian music scores from the 16th to 18th century).

References

External links 
  Les orgues de la "Tierra de Campos"
 Site de l'association des concerts spirituels de Montpon
 Chapelet Francis on cdandlp.com
 Francis Chapelet on calvados.free.fr
 Francis Chapelet, la passion des orgues on France Info
 Francis Chapelet on Discogs
 Francis Chapelet on France Musique
 Francis Chapelet on France Orgue
 Francis Chapelet à l'orgue de Ménestérol on YouTube

French classical organists
French male organists
1934 births
Living people
Musicians from Paris
Conservatoire de Paris alumni
Knights of the Ordre national du Mérite
Officiers of the Ordre des Arts et des Lettres
21st-century organists
21st-century French male musicians
Male classical organists